Store Koldewey, meaning 'Big Koldewey', is the largest of the Koldewey Islands in King Frederick VIII Land, northeastern Greenland.

History
The island was visited by the Second German North Polar Expedition 1869–70, led by Carl Koldewey and referred to as Grosse Koldewey Insel in the astronomy section of the expedition report, but this may not have been intended as a formal name.

The present island was shown on Koldewey's maps as three islands. However, the 1906–08 Danmark Expedition showed them to be connected and called the island Store Koldewey. Lille Koldewey is a smaller island to the northeast of its northern end.

Geography
Store Koldewey is the largest of the Koldewey Islands. It is a long and narrow island separating the Dove Bay to the west from the Greenland Sea. Between the island and the mainland —the Germanialand Peninsula— in the north there is a narrow sound and Lille Koldewey (Little Koldewey), a small double island, as well as some rocks.
The southernmost headland of the island is Cape Alf Trolle.

See also
List of islands of Greenland

References

Uninhabited islands of Greenland